

Ja 
Jablanica (Herzegovina-Neretva Canton), Jabuka, Jabuka, Jagodići, Jajce, Jarovići, Jasenica, Jasenik, Javorik

Je 
Jelačići, Jezero, Ježeprosina

Jo 
Jošanica

Lists of settlements in the Federation of Bosnia and Herzegovina (A-Ž)